Pseudonemasomatidae is a family of millipedes belonging to the order Julida.

Genera:
 Pseudonemasoma Enghoff, 1991

References

Julida